Sandro Callari (born 14 December 1953) is an Italian former cyclist. He competed in the team pursuit event at the 1976 Summer Olympics.

References

External links
 

1953 births
Living people
Italian male cyclists
Olympic cyclists of Italy
Cyclists at the 1976 Summer Olympics
Cyclists from Rome